Tarzo is a comune (municipality) in the Province of Treviso in the Italian region Veneto, located about  north of Venice and about  north of Treviso.

The municipality of Tarzo contains the frazioni (subdivisions, mainly villages and hamlets) Arfanta, Colmaggiore, Corbanese, Fratta, Nogarolo, and Resera.

Tarzo borders the following municipalities: Cison di Valmarino, Refrontolo, Revine Lago, San Pietro di Feletto, Vittorio Veneto.

Demographic evolution

References

External links
 Site of "Comune di Tarzo"

Cities and towns in Veneto